Sven Mattsson (5 May 1889 – 16 January 1967) was a Finnish wrestler. He competed in the freestyle heavyweight event at the 1920 Summer Olympics.

References

External links
 

1889 births
1967 deaths
Olympic wrestlers of Finland
Wrestlers at the 1920 Summer Olympics
Finnish male sport wrestlers
Sportspeople from Turku